Bourneville-Sainte-Croix is a commune in the department of Eure, northern France. The municipality was established on 1 January 2016 by merger of the former communes of Bourneville and Sainte-Croix-sur-Aizier.

See also 
Communes of the Eure department

References 

Communes of Eure
Populated places established in 2016
2016 establishments in France